Nobsa is a town and municipality in Sugamuxi Province, part of Boyacá department. The Chicamocha River flows through Nobsa. The municipality borders Santa Rosa de Viterbo and Floresta in the north, Corrales and Tópaga in the east, Tibasosa and Santa Rosa de Viterbo in the west and Tibasosa and Santa Rosa de Viterbo in the south.

Etymology 
Nobsa is derived from Chibcha and means "Decent bath of today".

History 
In the times before the Spanish conquest, the area of Nobsa was part of the Muisca Confederation, a loose confederation of the Muisca. Nobsa was ruled by the Tundama of Tundama.

Modern Nobsa was founded on January 9, 1593 by Jerónimo Holguín and Misael Millán.

Economy 
Main economical activities of Nobsa are agriculture, livestock farming, mining (predominantly limestone) and the production of wooden furniture.

Gallery

References 

Municipalities of Boyacá Department
Populated places established in 1593
1593 establishments in the Spanish Empire
Muisca Confederation
Muysccubun